Tumerepedes is a genus of butterflies in the family Lycaenidae, endemic to the Afrotropical realm. It consists of only one species, Tumerepedes flava, the Nigerian buff, which is found in northern Nigeria. The habitat consists of riverine forests.

References

Poritiinae
Monotypic butterfly genera
Taxa named by George Thomas Bethune-Baker
Lycaenidae genera